Myrtleville is a locality in the Upper Lachlan Shire, New South Wales, Australia. It lies about 36 km north of Goulburn and 9 km south of Taralga on the road from Goulburn to Oberon and Bathurst.

References

Upper Lachlan Shire
Localities in New South Wales